Lubomír Knapp (born 19 November 1950) is a Czech retired footballer who played as an attacking midfielder. He spent most of his career representing Czechoslovak club FC Baník Ostrava. Knapp won 3 Czechoslovak First League titles.

Honours
FC Baník Ostrava
 Czechoslovak First League: 1975–76, 1979–80, 1980–81

References

1950 births
Living people
Sportspeople from Prostějov
Czech footballers
FC Baník Ostrava players
SK Sigma Olomouc players
FK Frýdek-Místek players
Czechoslovak footballers
Association football midfielders
Czechoslovakia international footballers